S. R. Sathish Kumar is an Indian cinematographer, who has worked in the Tamil and Hindi film industries.

Career
S. R. Sathish Kumar initially apprenticed under P. Selvakumar and A. Rameshkumar. Afterwards, he worked with his friend and fellow cinematographer, N. K. Ekambaram, before getting his first opportunity as a senior cinematographer. Sathish Kumar began his career, as the main cinematographer, on Theekutchi, directed by A. I. Raja. He then worked with S. P. Jananathan on the action adventure film, Peranmai (2009), before signing on to work on Kalyanakrishnan's Bhooloham. The film's delay meant that he worked on the productions of Mappillai (2011) and Meaghamann (2014), earning critical acclaim for his work. For Meaghamann, he experimented with a phone camera for particular shots. He subsequently worked on the Hindi film, Desi Kattey (2014), before Bhooloham (2015) finally released.

Filmography

References

External links
 

Living people
Artists from Chennai
Tamil film cinematographers
Hindi film cinematographers
Cinematographers from Tamil Nadu
M.G.R. Government Film and Television Training Institute alumni
Year of birth missing (living people)